Michael Parker (9 August 1881 – 20 August 1958) was an Irish hurler. He was a member of the Wexford team that won the All-Ireland Championship in 1910.

Honours

Wexford
All-Ireland Senior Hurling Championship (1): 1910
Leinster Senior Hurling Championship (1): 1910

References

1881 births
1958 deaths
Wexford inter-county hurlers
All-Ireland Senior Hurling Championship winners